Patriarch Sophronius III may refer to:

 Patriarch Sophronius III of Alexandria, ruled in 1116–1171
 Sophronius III of Constantinople, ruled in 1863–1866